Shiloh High School may mean:
 Shiloh High School (Alabama) in Sardis, Dallas County, and which closed in favor of Sardis High School
 Shiloh High School (Georgia) in Snellville, Gwinnett County
 Shiloh High School (Illinois) in Shiloh Community Unit School District 1 in Hume, Edgar County